The Tampa Bay Lightning are an American professional ice hockey team based in Tampa, Florida. They play in the Atlantic Division of the Eastern Conference in the National Hockey League (NHL). Often referred to as the Bolts, the team joined the NHL in 1992 as an expansion team, and have won the Stanley Cup championship in 2004, 2020 and 2021. Having first played in the Expo Hall, and later in the ThunderDome (now known as Tropicana Field), the Lightning have played their home games at the Ice Palace, currently titled Amalie Arena, since 1996. The Lightning are owned by Jeffrey Vinik, Julien BriseBois is their general manager, and Steven Stamkos is the team captain.

There have been eight head coaches for the Lightning franchise. The team's first head coach was Terry Crisp, who coached for five seasons. John Tortorella, the only American to head coach the team, was the first Lightning coach to have won the Prince of Wales Trophy, the Stanley Cup, and to have been awarded the Jack Adams Award, all of which happened in the 2003–04 season. Steve Ludzik and Jon Cooper are the only two head coaches who have spent their entire NHL head coaching careers with the Lightning.

Jon Cooper is the team's current head coach, having been named to the position on March 25, 2013. Cooper is the only head coach of the Lightning to win the Prince of Wales Trophy four times. Under Cooper, the franchise won its second Stanley Cup championship in 2020 and third championship in 2021. Cooper is the franchise's all-time leader for the most regular season wins (434), playoff games coached (139), and the most playoff-games won (84).

Key

Coaches
Note: Statistics are correct through the end of the 2020–21 NHL season.

Notes
 A running total of the number of coaches of the Lightning. Thus, any coach who has two or more separate terms as head coach is only counted once.
 Before the 2005–06 season, the NHL instituted a penalty shootout for regular season games that remained tied after a five-minute overtime period, which prevented ties.
Each year is linked to an article about that particular NHL season.

References
General

Specific

 
coaches
Tampa Bay Lightning head coaches